Arryadia is a Moroccan public television sports channel. It is a part of the state-owned SNRT Group along with Al Aoula, Athaqafia, Al Maghribia, Assadissa, Aflam TV, Tamazight TV and Laayoune TV. The channel was launched on 16 September 2006. Arryadia is the official broadcaster of the  Moroccan league Botola.

History 
On 12 November 2022, Arryadia obtained rights to broadcast 10 matches including the Moroccan national team for the 2022 FIFA World Cup.

References

External links

Arryadia at LyngSat Address

Television stations in Morocco
Société Nationale de Radiodiffusion et de Télévision
Television channels and stations established in 2006
2006 establishments in Morocco